Fredrick Jamel Tipton (born June 14, 1982), better known by his stage name Freddie Gibbs, is an American rapper. After being signed to Interscope Records in 2006, Gibbs recorded his first album under the label. However, he was eventually dropped and the album was cancelled. Gibbs later signed with Young Jeezy's CTE World and released a number of mixtapes through the label, including 2012's highly acclaimed Baby Face Killa.

After leaving CTE in early 2013, Gibbs formed his own label ESGN, and released his album ESGN in June of that year. Since then, he has gone on to release four solo albums, as well as four collaborative albums, two with Madlib (as MadGibbs): Piñata (2014) and Bandana (2019),  and two with the Alchemist: Fetti (2018) (also a collaboration with rapper Currensy) and Alfredo (2020), the latter of which received a Grammy Award nomination for Best Rap Album at the 63rd Annual Grammy Awards.

Early life
Fredrick Tipton was born and raised in Gary, Indiana, and grew up at 17th and Virginia St. on the city's east side. He played American football at Ball State University on an athletic scholarship but was eventually expelled from college. At the age of 19, he was enlisted into the U.S. Army as part of a pre-trial diversion program when he was on trial for theft and gun charges, but was dishonorably discharged only eight months later after being caught smoking marijuana.

He then began working at a Gary mall, where he met local hip hop producer Finger Roll, who, according to Gibbs, was "the only guy [in Gary] that had a studio." Gibbs then joined Finger Roll's No Tamin Entertainment crew and began pursuing a rap career.

Tipton revealed that his father, a singer, was a member of the Chi-Lites on a December 8, 2022, All The Smoke podcast with Matt Barnes and Stephen Jackson.

Career

2004–2011: Career beginnings and CTE World
Gibbs' rap career began in 2004, self-releasing his first full-length project, a mixtape titled Full Metal Jackit, which he followed up with a sequel that same year. Around that time, he was signed to Interscope Records and began working on his debut album, but was dropped from the label in late 2006, when the man that signed him, Joe Weinberger, left the label. Gibbs released his first extended play Str8 Killa in August 2010.

He would continue self-releasing mixtapes until 2011, when he signed to Young Jeezy's record label CTE World. In February that year, Gibbs announced on his website that he had joined up with fellow rappers King Chip and The Cool Kids to form the supergroup Pulled Over by the Cops (P.O.C.). In October, he released the mixtape Cold Day in Hell, which featured guest appearances from Young Jeezy, Juicy J, and 2 Chainz, among others. The mixtape received significant coverage from publications such as Pitchfork and XXL, appearing on the latter's Freshman List Class of 2010. Gibbs and hip hop producer Madlib released their first and second extended plays, titled Thuggin' and Shame, in September 2011 and June 2012, respectively. The EPs served as previews for their upcoming collaborative album, which was originally titled Cocaine Piñata, and later renamed to simply Piñata.

Shortly after the release of Cold Day in Hell, Gibbs announced that his next mixtape would be a Gangsta Grillz mixtape titled Baby Face Killa. It was released on September 25, 2012 and featured guest appearances from Pharrell Williams, Jadakiss, Jay Rock, Currensy, YG, and others. The second track from the album, "Still Livin'" was featured on the 2013 video game Grand Theft Auto V's virtual in-game radio station Radio Los Santos.

2012–2018: Solo albums and Piñata
On December 11, 2012, Gibbs announced that he was no longer a member of Young Jeezy's CTE label. He elaborated saying that there is no beef between the two rappers. On May 27, 2013, Freddie Gibbs announced he would be releasing his debut album ESGN (Evil Seeds Grow Naturally) on July 9, 2013 through his own record label of the same name. The album ended up being released on June 20, three weeks before the planned release date, due to a leak.

In September 2013, Freddie Gibbs and Madlib released Deeper, the final EP from the Piñata previews trilogy. Piñata itself was subsequently released on March 18, 2014. The album received universal acclaim from music critics with a score of 82 on the review site Metacritic. It peaked at number 39 on the US Billboard 200 and number seven on the US Top Rap Albums charts. On July 1, 2014, Gibbs, Young Thug, and ASAP Ferg released a single titled "Old English". It was produced by Salva and Nick Hook and was certified Gold by the Recording Industry Association of America (RIAA) on July 23, 2020 for selling over 500,000 certified units. In October 2014, Gibbs and Madlib released their fourth EP, titled Knicks (Remix).

In March 2015, Gibbs released a three-track EP titled Pronto, which was followed up by his second solo studio album, Shadow of a Doubt, released on November 20, 2015. Gibbs's third solo studio album, You Only Live 2wice, was released in March 2017. The only single, "Crushed Glass", was released simultaneously alongside a music video directed by Eric Nelson. In June 2018, he released his fourth studio album, Freddie without any prior announcements.

2018–present: Further collaborations and increasing success
After the success of Piñata, Gibbs and Madlib announced in May 2016 that they were developing a second collaborative album. The resulting project was the album Bandana, which was released in June 2019. Bandana was preceded by two singles: "Flat Tummy Tea" and "Bandana", the latter featuring the dancehall artist Assassin. The singles were released in February and March 2019 respectively. Bandana was released by Keep Cool Records, RCA Records, Madlib Invazion, and ESGN, and received critical acclaim.

Gibbs also released multiple collaborations with producer The Alchemist. Their first project together was Fetti, a collaborative album between Gibbs, The Alchemist, and rapper Currensy. Fetti was released in October 2018. Gibbs and The Alchemist then reunited to release a second collaborative album, titled Alfredo, in May 2020. Alfredo was preceded a day earlier by its lead single, "1985", as well as an accompanying music video directed by Nick Walker. The album debuted at number 15 on the Billboard 200, making it both Gibbs' and The Alchemist's highest-charting album to date. It was critically praised, and was nominated for a Grammy Award for Best Rap Album at the 63rd Annual Grammy Awards,

In June 2020, Gibbs signed to Warner Records. Throughout late 2020 and early 2021, Gibbs released three singles through the label: "4 Thangs", which features guest appearances from fellow rapper Big Sean and hip hop producer Hit-Boy; "Gang Signs", featuring fellow rapper Schoolboy Q; and "Big Boss Rabbit". Gibbs then released his first album on Warner and fifth overall solo album, Soul Sold Separately, in September 2022.

In addition to his musical ventures, Gibbs had a cameo role in the first season of the Starz drama series Power Book IV: Force in March 2022. He portrayed the role of Cousin Buddy, a cross-eyed drug dealer.

Artistry
Critics have recognized Gibbs' technically proficient and stylistically diverse rapping ability. Matthew Ramirez of NPR has described him as "the eternal technician"; Tshepo Mokoena of The Guardian characterized him as "a classic rapper's rapper" and stated that "when it comes to technique and versatility, he can take your breath away". He was featured on the soundtracks for Max Payne 3, NBA 2K12, Sleeping Dogs, and Grand Theft Auto V.

Gibbs has listed Scarface, DMX, Tupac, Jay-Z, Nas, Bone Thugs-N-Harmony, Geto Boys, UGK, Three 6 Mafia, Outkast, Raekwon, Eminem, Twista, Ice Cube, Noreaga, Juvenile, Spice 1, De La Soul, Kool G Rap, Black Thought, Mos Def, Jeezy, and Ol' Dirty Bastard as some of his influences.

Personal life
On November 4, 2014, a gunman opened fire on Gibbs, who was sitting in a car after he had finished performing at a record store in Williamsburg, Brooklyn, New York. Gibbs escaped unharmed and two members of his entourage received non-life-threatening gunshot wounds.

In May 2015, Gibbs launched a GoFundMe to help School Supply Giveaway of Gary purchase school supplies for children in Gary, Indiana. On the site page, Gibbs explained, "Growing up in Gary there was little opportunity for a kid like me to make something of myself. Not having the basic supplies ... left a lot of us with little motivation to do well in school and turned a lot of us to darker paths. By helping these students acquire the basic supplies every student needs and deserves you will be maximizing their chances at a brighter future."

Before performing a concert Le Rex in Toulouse, France, in June 2016, Gibbs was arrested on a European arrest warrant issued for a rape alleged to have taken place in Austria in 2015, and extradited to Austria on sexual assault charges, Gibbs said he "has no intention of escaping justice, whether French or Austrian" and was charged the following month with sexual abuse charges on two women.
After being held in jail for a number of weeks he was released on bail of €50,000, and acquitted on all charges in September 2016.

Gibbs has said that while he is not a fan of organized religion, he most closely identifies as a Muslim, calling it "a personal relationship between myself and God."

Gibbs is the father of two children: a daughter (born 2015) with his ex-fiancée Erica Dickerson and a son from a previous relationship.

Discography

Studio albums
 ESGN (2013)
 Shadow of a Doubt (2015)
 You Only Live 2wice (2017)
 Freddie (2018)
 $oul $old $eparately (2022)

Collaboration albums
 Piñata  (2014)
 Fetti  (2018)
 Bandana  (2019)
 Alfredo  (2020)

Concert tours
Headlining
 Shadow of a Doubt Tour (2016)
 You Only Live 2wice Tour (2017)
 Freddie Tour (2018)
 The Album of the Year Tour (2019)
 Space Rabbit Tour (2022)

Co-headlining
 Independent Grind Tour 2014  (2014)

Supporting
 Young Jeezy – TM103 Tour (2011)

Awards and nominations

References

External links

 
 
 
 

1982 births
African-American male rappers
Five percenters
Living people
Midwest hip hop musicians
People acquitted of sex crimes
Rappers from Indiana
Indie rappers
Gangsta rappers
21st-century American rappers
Musicians from Gary, Indiana
21st-century American male musicians
21st-century African-American musicians
20th-century African-American people
Ball State Cardinals football players
Converts to Islam
American Muslims